Elections to the Uttar Pradesh Legislative Assembly were held in phases, in February and May 1985, to elect members of the 425 constituencies in Uttar Pradesh, India. The Indian National Congress won a majority of seats as well as the popular vote, and Narayan Datt Tiwari was re-appointed as the Chief Minister of Uttar Pradesh.

This election was scheduled, as the five-year term of the members elected in the previous election, in 1980, was due to end in May 1985.
After the passing of The Delimitation of Parliamentary and Assembly Constituencies Order, 1976, the constituencies were set to the ones used in this election.

Result

Elected Members

Bypolls

See also
List of constituencies of the Uttar Pradesh Legislative Assembly
1985 elections in India

References

Uttar Pradesh
1985
1985